The Industrial Development (Financial Assistance) Act 2003 (c 11) was an Act of the Parliament of the United Kingdom.

The Industrial Development (Financial Assistance) Act 2003 was repealed on 21 May 2009 by section 1(2) of the Industry and Exports (Financial Support) Act 2009. Section 1 of the Industrial Development (Financial Assistance) Act 2003 is superseded by section 1(1) of the Industry and Exports (Financial Support) Act 2009.

References
Halsbury's Statutes,

External links
The Industrial Development (Financial Assistance) Act 2003, as amended from the National Archives.
The Industrial Development (Financial Assistance) Act 2003, as originally enacted from the National Archives.
Explanatory notes to the Industrial Development (Financial Assistance) Act 2003.

United Kingdom Acts of Parliament 2003